80th NYFCC Awards
January 5, 2015

Best Picture: 
Boyhood

The 80th New York Film Critics Circle Awards, honoring the best in film for 2014, were announced on December 1, 2014 and presented on January 5, 2015.

Winners

Best Film:
Boyhood
Best Director:
Richard Linklater – Boyhood
Best Actor:
Timothy Spall – Mr. Turner
Best Actress:
Marion Cotillard – Two Days, One Night and The Immigrant
Best Supporting Actor:
J. K. Simmons – Whiplash
Best Supporting Actress:
Patricia Arquette – Boyhood
Best Screenplay:
Wes Anderson – The Grand Budapest Hotel
Best Animated Film:
The Lego Movie
Best Cinematography:
Darius Khondji – The Immigrant
Best Non-Fiction Film:
Citizenfour
Best Foreign Language Film:
Ida • PolandBest First Film:
Jennifer Kent – The Babadook''
Special Award:
Adrienne Mancia

References

External links
 2014 Awards

New York Film Critics Circle Awards
New York
2014 in American cinema
2014 awards in the United States
2014 in New York City